Janis is a compilation album by Janis Joplin, released in 1993. The album features a broad overview of her career from her very first recording in December 1962, to the last songs she recorded during the sessions for Pearl just a few days before her death in October 1970.

Critical reception 

Janis was voted the seventh best reissue of 1993 in The Village Voices annual Pazz & Jop critics poll; Robert Christgau—the poll's supervisor—called it "a smart, audiowise set that not only gets Joplin's achievement right but helps us understand it".

Track listing

Disc one
 "What Good Can Drinkin' Do"  – 2:45 (recorded in 1962, previously unreleased; a different version was released on Janis [1975 album])
 "Trouble in Mind" – 3:03 (recorded in 1965, previously unreleased; a different version was released on Janis [1975 album])
 "Hesitation Blues" – 4:05  (recorded in 1965, previously unreleased)
 "Easy Rider" – 2:24  (Big Brother & the Holding Company, 1967)
 "Coo Coo" – 2:05 (Big Brother & the Holding Company, 1967)
 "Down on Me" – 2:06 (Big Brother & the Holding Company, 1967)
 "The Last Time" – 2:17 (Big Brother & the Holding Company, 1967)
 "All Is Loneliness" – 2:19 (Big Brother & the Holding Company, 1967)
 "Call on Me"  – 3:37 (live, recorded in 1967, previously unreleased, original version released on Big Brother & the Holding Company)
 "Women Is Losers" – 5:08 (live, recorded in 1967, previously unreleased, original version released on Big Brother & the Holding Company)
 "Intruder" – 2:32 (Big Brother & the Holding Company, 1967)
 "Light Is Faster than Sound" – 2:32 (Big Brother & the Holding Company, 1967)
 "Bye, Bye Baby" – 2:39 (Big Brother & the Holding Company, 1967)
 "Farewell Song" – 4:24 (previously unreleased, from the Cheap Thrills sessions)
 "Flower in the Sun" – 3:13 (In Concert, 1972)
 "Misery'n"  – 4:09 (previously unissued alternate take, from the Cheap Thrills sessions)
 "Road Block" – 6:12  (live, previously unreleased, from the Monterey Pop Festival, 1967)
 "Ball and Chain" – 8:07  (live, previously unreleased, from the Monterey Pop Festival, 1967)

Disc two
 "Combination of the Two" – 5:52 (Cheap Thrills, 1968)
 "I Need a Man to Love" – 4:53 (Cheap Thrills, 1968)
 "Piece of My Heart" – 4:28 (Cheap Thrills, 1968)
 "Turtle Blues" – 4:30 (Cheap Thrills, 1968)
 "Oh, Sweet Mary" – 4:16 (Cheap Thrills, 1968)
 "Catch Me Daddy" – 4:56 (previously unreleased, from the Cheap Thrills sessions)
 "Summertime" – 4:07 (previously unreleased alternate take, from the Cheap Thrills sessions)
 "Kozmic Blues" – 4:24 (I Got Dem Ol' Kozmic Blues Again Mama!, 1969)
 "Try (Just a Little Bit Harder)" – 3:58 (I Got Dem Ol' Kozmic Blues Again Mama!, 1969)
 "One Good Man" – 4:11 (I Got Dem Ol' Kozmic Blues Again Mama!, 1969)
 "Dear Landlord" – 2:33 (previously unreleased, from the I Got Dem Ol' Kozmic Blues Again Mama! sessions)
 "To Love Somebody" – 5:19 (I Got Dem Ol' Kozmic Blues Again Mama!, 1969)
 "As Good as You've Been to This World" – 5:27 (I Got Dem Ol' Kozmic Blues Again Mama!, 1969)
 "Little Girl Blue" – 3:51 (I Got Dem Ol' Kozmic Blues Again Mama!, 1969)
 "Work Me, Lord" – 6:38 (I Got Dem Ol' Kozmic Blues Again Mama!, 1969)
 "Raise Your Hand" – 2:17 (live, from The Ed Sullivan Show, 1969)
 "Maybe" – 4:07 (live, from The Ed Sullivan Show, 1969)

Disc three
 "Me and Bobby McGee" – 4:49 (alternate version)
 "One Night Stand" – 3:10 (alternate take)
 "Tell Mama" – 5:48 (live, from Farewell Song, 1982)
 "Try (Just a Little Bit Harder)" – 8:16 (live, from In Concert, 1972)
 "Cry Baby" – 4:59 (previously unreleased, from the Pearl sessions)
 "Move Over" – 3:42 (Pearl, 1970)
 "A Woman Left Lonely" – 3:29 (Pearl, 1970)
 "Half Moon" – 3:53 (Pearl, 1970)
 "Happy Birthday, John (Happy Trails)" – 1:10 (previously unreleased, recorded for John Lennon)
 "My Baby" – 3:45 (Pearl, 1970)
 "Mercedes Benz" – 2:14 (Pearl, 1970, includes a previously-unissued longer spoken intro)
 "Trust Me" – 3:17 (Pearl, 1970)
 "Get It While You Can" – 3:25 (Pearl, 1970)
 "Me and Bobby McGee" – 4:29 (Pearl, 1970)

Certifications

References

1993 compilation albums
Janis Joplin compilation albums
Columbia Records compilation albums